Bart Wellens (born 10 August 1978) is a Belgian former professional cyclo-cross and road cyclist. He now works as the team manager of UCI Cyclo-cross Team .

Career
Wellens was born in Vorselaar. In the Under 23 category, Wellens battled Sven Nys. Wellens won the Under 23 Belgian championships in 1997 beating Nys while Nys got revenge at the UCI Under 23 World Cyclo-Cross championships a month later. Wellens had to settle for second place. The following year Wellens again finished second to Nys at the World Championships. Nys then left the category and Wellens became the Under 23 World Champion for two years in a row. Wellens turned professional in 2000 with the Spaar Select team. In 2002/03 season, Wellens won the World Cup and then won the Elite World Championships.

In the following season 2003/04 he dominated the sport and beat rival Sven Nys in both the Gazet van Antwerpen and the Superprestige series. Wellens also beat Nys to become Belgian champion and as defending champion Wellens retained his World title after narrowly winning a sprint against Mario De Clercq. With these wins together with a third place overall in the World Cup, Wellens was very close to being the first cyclist to win the Grand Slam of cyclo-cross. Entering the final World Cup event where there were double points on offer, Wellens needed to win or that place in the top five ahead of Nys. However, in the end it was Richard Groenendaal who won the race and took the World Cup lead. Wellens could not compete in the final events of the Superprestige and the Gazet van Antwerpen due to injury, despite having already won both classifications.

Wellens started the 2004/05 season as World Champion but the season started poorly with a lack of form followed by injury. However his form returned toward the end of the season where he won the Grand Prix Rouwmoer in Essen, a Gazet van Antwerpen race.

In the 2005 edition of the Vlaamse Druivenveldrit Overijse, Wellens kicked a spectator who was allegedly throwing beer at him. Wellens went on to win the event after Boom slipped in the final lap and initially was awarded the win despite the threat of disqualification. Several days later after a meeting of the three race commissionaires and the UCI, Wellens was disqualified and Boom was awarded the win. Later Wellens was served with a ban from racing during the first month (September) of the following season (2006/07).

Personal life
His younger brother Geert also competed professionally as a cyclist, including a year with his brother. He starred in the reality television series Wellens en Wee on Flemish TV-channel VT4. In this series, Wellens together with his parents, Lucien and Wiske, and his other teammates were shown in their daily lives and preparations for the weekend races.

Major results

Road

2008
 1st Stage 1 Volta a Lleida
2010
 4th Overall Czech Cycling Tour

Cyclo-cross

1995–1996
 1st  National Junior Championships
1996–1997
 1st  National Under-23 Championships
 2nd  UCI World Under-23 Championships
1997–1998
 1st  National Under-23 Championships
 2nd  UCI World Under-23 Championships
 Superprestige
3rd Gieten
1998–1999
 1st  UCI World Under-23 Championships
 1st  National Under-23 Championships
 2nd Overall Superprestige
1st Hoogstraten
2nd Diegem
3rd Gavere
3rd Gieten
3rd Overijse
3rd Surhuisterveen
 UCI World Cup
2nd Koksijde
1999–2000
 1st  UCI World Under-23 Championships
 1st  National Under-23 Championships
 UCI World Cup
1st Kalmthout
 Gazet van Antwerpen
1st Essen
2nd Rijkevorsel
2nd Lille
2nd Oostmalle
 Superprestige
2nd Hoogstraten
2nd Surhuisterveen
3rd Silvelle
2000–2001
 2nd Overall UCI World Cup
1st Tábor
2nd Bergamo
3rd Heusden-Zolder
 2nd Overall Superprestige
1st Harnes
2nd Ruddervorde
2nd Gieten
3rd Sint-Michielsgestel
 2nd Loenhout
 3rd Overall Gazet van Antwerpen
1st Oostmalle
2nd Lille
 3rd National Championships
2001–2002
 1st Ardooie
 1st Contern
 1st Vossem
 1st Woerden
 2nd Eeklo
 2nd Veldegem
 3rd Overall Superprestige
1st Ruddervorde
2nd Gieten
3rd Sint-Michielsgestel
3rd Vorselaar
 3rd Overall Gazet van Antwerpen
1st Kalmthout
1st Lille
3rd Niel
 3rd Overall UCI World Cup
2nd Monopoli
2nd Igorre
3rd Heerlen
2002–2003
 1st  UCI World Championships
 1st  Overall UCI World Cup
1st Frankfurt
1st Wetzikon
2nd Hoogerheide
3rd Liévin
 1st Eeklo
 1st Overijse
 1st Tábor
 2nd Overall Superprestige
1st Gavere
1st Vorselaar
2nd Gieten
3rd Sint-Michielsgestel
3rd Hoogstraten
3rd Harnes
 2nd Overall Gazet van Antwerpen
1st Niel
2nd Essen
2nd Lille
2nd Oostmalle
3rd Koppenbergcross
 2nd Hamme
 2nd Woerden
 2nd Zonnebeke
 3rd National Championships
 3rd Eernegem
2003–2004
 1st  UCI World Championships
 1st  National Championships
 1st Overall Superprestige
1st Ruddervorde
1st Gavere
1st Gieten
1st Diegem
2nd Sint-Michielsgestel
2nd Harnes
3rd Hoogstraten
 1st Overall Gazet van Antwerpen
1st Koppenbergcross
1st Niel
1st Kalmthout
1st Essen
1st Loenhout
 1st Dottenijs
 1st Harderwijk
 1st Hooglede
 1st Milan
 1st Overijse
 1st Surhuisterveen
 1st Vossem
 1st Woerden
 2nd Middelkerke
 3rd Overall UCI World Cup
1st Nommay
2nd Torino
2nd Wetzikon
 3rd Eernegem
2004–2005
 Gazet van Antwerpen
1st Essen
2nd Baal
 Superprestige
2nd Gieten
2nd Vorselaar
 2nd Heerlen
2005–2006
 UCI World Cup
1st Igorre
2nd Kalmthout
3rd Wetzikon
 1st Ardooie
 1st Dottenijs
 1st Erpe-Mere
 1st Neerpelt
 2nd Overall Gazet van Antwerpen
1st Essen
2nd Koppenbergcross
3rd Niel
 2nd  UCI World Championships
 3rd Overall Superprestige
1st Ruddervorde
1st Sint-Michielsgestel
2nd Hamme
3rd Vorselaar
 3rd National Championships
 3rd Eeklo
2006–2007
 1st  National Championships
 1st Lebbeke
 1st Middelkerke
 1st Veghel-Eerde
 2nd Overall UCI World Cup
1st Milan
2nd Aigle
2nd Tábor
2nd Koksijde
2nd Igorre
2nd Nommay
 2nd Neerpelt
 Gazet van Antwerpen
1st Niel
2nd Hasselt
2nd Essen
 3rd Overall Superprestige
2nd Hamme
2nd Diegem
3rd Ruddervorde
2007–2008
 1st Zonhoven
 1st Zonnebeke
 2nd Overall Gazet van Antwerpen
1st Niel
2nd Oostmalle
2nd Lille
2nd Hasselt
2nd Koppenbergcross
 UCI World Cup
2nd Pijnacker
2nd Igorre
2nd Hofstade
2nd Liévin
2nd Hoogerheide
 2nd Overall Superprestige
3rd Ruddervorde
3rd Hamme
3rd Gavere
3rd Veghel-Eerde
 2nd National Championships
 2nd Eeklo
 2nd Overijse
 3rd Antwerpen
 3rd Ardooie
 3rd Dottenijs
 3rd Harderwijk
 3rd Neerpelt
2008–2009
 1st Asteasu
 1st Sint-Niklaas
 2nd Overall Gazet van Antwerpen
1st Hasselt
3rd Lille
 2nd Overall UCI World Cup
3rd Nommay
 2nd Lebbeke
 2nd Neerpelt
 2nd Sint-Michielsgestel
 3rd Overall Superprestige
2nd Gieten
2nd Gavere
3rd Hamme
3rd Hoogstraten
 3rd Maldegem
 3rd Mechelen
2009–2010
 Gazet van Antwerpen
1st Oostmalle
 1st Eeklo
 3rd Maldegem
 3rd Zonnebeke
2010–2011
 1st Cauberg
 2nd National Championships
 UCI World Cup
3rd Heusden-Zolder
 Superprestige
3rd Middelkerke
 Fidea Classics
3rd Niel
2011–2012
 Gazet van Antwerpen
1st Essen
3rd Baal
 1st Issaquah
 1st Redmond
 1st Sun Prairie Day 2
 2nd Kalmthout
 2nd Sun Prairie Day 1
2012–2013
 1st Maldegem
 2nd Otegem
 2nd Woerden
 Superprestige
3rd Gavere
2013–2014
 3rd National Championships

References

External links
 
 
 

1978 births
Living people
Belgian male cyclists
Cyclo-cross cyclists
UCI Cyclo-cross World Champions (men)
Sportspeople from Antwerp Province
People from Vorselaar
Belgian cyclo-cross champions